The name Merops (Ancient Greek: Μέροψ means "mankind, mortals" or "dividing the voice") refers to several figures from Greek mythology:

 Merops, king of Ethiopia, husband of Clymene and adoptive father of Phaethon, his wife's son by Helios.
 Merops, a resident of Miletus, husband of another Clymene and father of Pandareus.
 Merops, king of Percote, father of two sons (Amphius and Adrastus) killed by Diomedes in the Trojan War, and of two daughters, Cleite, wife of Cyzicus, and Arisbe, the first wife of Priam. He had prophetic abilities and foresaw the deaths of his sons, but they ignored his warnings. Merops also taught Aesacus to interpret dreams.
 Merops, a son of Triopas, or an autochthon and a king of Cos (the island was thought to have been named after his daughter). He was married to the nymph Ethemea (or, more correctly, Echemeia), who was shot by Artemis for having ceased to worship the goddess. As Merops was about to commit suicide over his wife Echemeia's death, Hera took pity on the grieving widower and changed his shape into that of an eagle, and later placed him among the stars (the constellation Aquila). Merops was the father of Eumelus and through him grandfather of Agron, Byssa and Meropis, all of whom were notorious for their impiety. Clytie, the wife of Eurypylus of Cos, and Titanis, who was changed by Artemis into a deer because of her beauty, were given as the daughters of Merops.
 Merops, king of Anthemousia, who fought against Sithon of Thrace for the hand of the latter's daughter Pallene and was killed.
Merops, whose daughter Epione was the wife of Asclepius.
Merops, son of Hyas, who was the first to make people reassemble in settlements after the great deluge.
Merops, a great-grandson of Temenus in the following genealogy of the Heracleidae: Heracles - Hyllus - Cleodaeus - Aristomachus - Temenus - Cissius - Thestius - Merops - Aristodamis - Pheidon - Caranus.

Notes

References 

 Antoninus Liberalis, The Metamorphoses of Antoninus Liberalis translated by Francis Celoria (Routledge 1992). Online version at the Topos Text Project.
 Apollonius Rhodius, Argonautica translated by Robert Cooper Seaton (1853-1915), R. C. Loeb Classical Library Volume 001. London, William Heinemann Ltd, 1912. Online version at the Topos Text Project.
 Apollonius Rhodius, Argonautica. George W. Mooney. London. Longmans, Green. 1912. Greek text available at the Perseus Digital Library.
 Conon, Fifty Narrations, surviving as one-paragraph summaries in the Bibliotheca (Library) of Photius, Patriarch of Constantinople translated from the Greek by Brady Kiesling. Online version at the Topos Text Project.
 Diodorus Siculus, The Library of History translated by Charles Henry Oldfather. Twelve volumes. Loeb Classical Library. Cambridge, Massachusetts: Harvard University Press; London: William Heinemann, Ltd. 1989. Vol. 3. Books 4.59–8. Online version at Bill Thayer's Web Site
 Diodorus Siculus, Bibliotheca Historica. Vol 1-2. Immanel Bekker. Ludwig Dindorf. Friedrich Vogel. in aedibus B. G. Teubneri. Leipzig. 1888-1890. Greek text available at the Perseus Digital Library.
 Euripides, The Complete Greek Drama, edited by Whitney J. Oates and Eugene O'Neill, Jr. in two volumes. 2. Helen, translated by Robert Potter. New York. Random House. 1938. Online version at the Perseus Digital Library.
 Euripides, Euripidis Fabulae. vol. 3. Gilbert Murray. Oxford. Clarendon Press, Oxford. 1913. Greek text available at the Perseus Digital Library.
 Gaius Julius Hyginus, Fabulae from The Myths of Hyginus translated and edited by Mary Grant. University of Kansas Publications in Humanistic Studies. Online version at the Topos Text Project.
 Homer, The Iliad with an English Translation by A.T. Murray, Ph.D. in two volumes. Cambridge, MA., Harvard University Press; London, William Heinemann, Ltd. 1924. . Online version at the Perseus Digital Library.
 Homer, Homeri Opera in five volumes. Oxford, Oxford University Press. 1920. . Greek text available at the Perseus Digital Library.
 Pausanias, Description of Greece with an English Translation by W.H.S. Jones, Litt.D., and H.A. Ormerod, M.A., in 4 Volumes. Cambridge, MA, Harvard University Press; London, William Heinemann Ltd. 1918. . Online version at the Perseus Digital Library
 Pausanias, Graeciae Descriptio. 3 vols. Leipzig, Teubner. 1903.  Greek text available at the Perseus Digital Library.
 Pseudo-Apollodorus, The Library with an English Translation by Sir James George Frazer, F.B.A., F.R.S. in 2 Volumes, Cambridge, MA, Harvard University Press; London, William Heinemann Ltd. 1921. . Online version at the Perseus Digital Library. Greek text available from the same website.
 Publius Ovidius Naso, Metamorphoses translated by Brookes More (1859-1942). Boston, Cornhill Publishing Co. 1922. Online version at the Perseus Digital Library.
 Publius Ovidius Naso, Metamorphoses. Hugo Magnus. Gotha (Germany). Friedr. Andr. Perthes. 1892. Latin text available at the Perseus Digital Library.
 Stephanus of Byzantium, Stephani Byzantii Ethnicorum quae supersunt, edited by August Meineike (1790-1870), published 1849. A few entries from this important ancient handbook of place names have been translated by Brady Kiesling. Online version at the Topos Text Project.
 Theocritus, Idylls from The Greek Bucolic Poets translated by Edmonds, J M. Loeb Classical Library Volume 28. Cambridge, MA. Harvard Univserity Press. 1912. Online version at theoi.com
 Theocritus, Idylls edited by R. J. Cholmeley, M.A. London. George Bell & Sons. 1901. Greek text available at the Perseus Digital Library.

Kings in Greek mythology
Helios in mythology
Deeds of Hera
Metamorphoses into birds in Greek mythology